Acacia tindaleae is a shrub of the genus Acacia and the subgenus Phyllodineae. It is native to an area in central New South Wales and a small area in southern Queensland.

See also
 List of Acacia species

References

tindaleae
Flora of New South Wales
Flora of Queensland